The Dizionario Biografico degli Italiani is a biographical dictionary published by the Istituto dell'Enciclopedia Italiana, started in 1925 and completed in 2020.  It includes about 40,000 biographies of distinguished Italians.
The entries are signed by their authors and provide a rich bibliography.

History

The work was conceived in 1925, to follow the model of similar works such as the German Allgemeine Deutsche Biographie (1912, 56 volumes) or the British Dictionary of National Biography (from 2004 the Oxford Dictionary of National Biography; 60 volumes). 
It is planned to include biographical entries on Italians who deserve to be preserved in history and who lived at any time during the long period from the fall of the Western Roman Empire to the present.  As director of the Treccani, Giovanni Gentile entrusted the task of coordinating the work of drafting to Fortunato Pintor, who was soon joined by Arsenio Frugoni.  In 1959 the direction was taken up by Alberto Maria Ghisalberti.

The first volume appeared in 1960 to mark the 100th anniversary of the unification of Italy. 
It had taken about 15 years to organize a huge index of historical figures from which 40,000 were selected as Italians deserving to be remembered by a separate entry. 
92 volumes had been published by 2018, up to the letter "S" (Sisto IV). 
Updates were occasionally issued.  For example, in 1990 a supplement was issued for the letters A-C containing entries of people who had died before 1985. 
The final work should be composed of 110 volumes, excluding appendices and supplements.

In October 2009, following the threatened closure of the work, or reduction to a simplified version that would only be maintained online, the publisher launched an appeal to ensure the continuation according to the strict scholarly criteria that had hitherto characterized the paper version.

In 2010 the list of planned items from the letters M to Z was published, for the purpose of their inclusion in the planned future volumes. 
Currently the director of the work is Raffaele Romanelli. 
In March 2011 a new portal was designed to access the dictionary, in conjunction with the online version of the Treccani Encyclopaedia.
This was formally launched on the occasion of the 150th anniversary of Italy.

Volumes

 1: Aaron-Albertucci
 2:  Albicante-Ammannati
 3:  Ammirato-Arcoleo
 4:  Arconati-Bacaredda
 5:  Bacca-Baratta
 6:  Baratteri-Bartolozzi
 7:  Bartolucci-Bellotto
 8:  Bellucci-Beregan
 9:  Berengario-Biagini
 10: Biagio-Boccaccio
 11: Boccadibue-Bonetti
 12: Bonfadini-Borrello
 13: Borremans-Brancazolo
 14: Branchi-Buffetti
 15: Buffoli-Caccianemici
 16: Caccianiga-Caluso
 17: Calvart-Canefri
 18: Canella-Cappello
 19: Cappi-Cardona
 20: Carducci-Carusi
 21: Caruso-Castelnuovo
 22: Castelvetro-Cavallotti
 23: Cavallucci-Cerretesi
 24: Cerreto-Chini
 25: Chinzer-Cirni
 26: Cironi-Collegno
 27: Collenuccio-Confortini
 28: Conforto-Cordero
 29: Cordier-Corvo
 30: Cosattini-Crispolto
 31: Cristaldi-Dalla Nave
 32: Dall'Anconata-Da Ronco
 33: D'Asaro-De Foresta
 34: Primo supplemento A-C
 35: Indice A-C
 36: De Fornari-Della Fonte
 37: Della Fratta-Della Volpaia
 38: Della Volpe-Denza
 39: Deodato-Di Falco
 40: Di Fausto-Donadoni
 41: Donaggio-Dugnani
 42: Dugoni-Enza
 43: Enzo-Fabrizi
 44: Fabron-Farina
 45: Farinacci-Fedrigo
 46: Feducci-Ferrerio
 47: Ferrero-Filonardi
 48: Filoni-Forghieri
 49: Forino-Francesco da Serino
 50: Francesco 1. Sforza-Gabbi
 51: Gabbiani-Gamba
 52: Gambacorta-Gelasio 2
 53: Gelati-Ghisalberti
 54: Ghiselli-Gimma
 55: Ginammi-Giovanni da Crema
 56: Giovanni Di Crescenzio-Giulietti
 57: Giulini-Gonzaga
 58: Gonzales-Graziani
 59: Graziano-Grossi Gondi
 60: Grosso-Guglielmo da Forli
 61: Guglielmo Gonzaga-Jacobini
 62: Iacobiti-Labriola
 63: Labroca-Laterza
 64: Latilla-Levi Montalcini
 65: Levis-Lorenzetti
 66: Lorenzetto-Macchetti
 67: Macchi-Malaspina
 68: Malatacca-Mangelli
 69: Mangiabotti-Marconi
 70: Marcora-Marsilio
 71: Marsilli-Massimino da Salerno
 72: Massimo-Mechetti
 73: Meda-Messadaglia
 74: Messi-Miraglia
 75: Miranda-Montano
 76: Montauti-Morlaiter
 77: Morlini-Natolini
 78: Natta-Nurra
 79: Nursio-Ottolini Visconti
 80: Ottone-Pansa
 81:  Pansini-Pazienza
 82: Pazzi-Pia
 83: Piacentini-Pio V
 84: Piovene-Ponzo
 85: Ponzone-Quercia
 86: Querenghi-Rensi
 87: Renzi-Robortello (2016)
 88: Robusti-Roverella (2017)
 89: Rovereto-Salvemini (2017)
 90: Salvestrini-Saviozzo da Siena (2017)
 91: Savoia-Semeria (2018)
 92: Semino-Sisto IV (2018)
 93: Sisto V-Stammati (2019)
 94: Stampa-Tarantelli (2019)
 95: Taranto-Togni (2019)
 96: Toja-Trivelli(2019)
 97: Trivulzio-Valeri (2020)
 98: Valeriani-Verra (2020)
 99: Verrazzano-Vittorio Amedeo (2020)
100:Vittorio Emanuele I-Zurlo (2020)

References

External links

Italian-language encyclopedias
Italian encyclopedias
Biographical dictionaries
20th-century encyclopedias
21st-century encyclopedias
Book series introduced in 1960